Martín López-Vega (born 1975 in Poo, Llanes, Asturias) is a Spanish and Asturian poet.

Published works

Asturian
Esiliu (poetry, 1998)
Les coraes de la roca (poetry, together with Chechu García, 1999)
La visita (poetry, 2000)
El sentimientu d'un occidental (prose, 2000)
Piedra filosofal (poetry, 2002)
Parte metereolóxicu pa Arcadia y redolada (prose, 2005)

Spanish
Objectos robados (poetry, 1994)
Travesías (poetry, 1996)
Cartas portuguesas (travelogue, 1997)
Los desvanes del mundo (prose, 1999)
La emboscada (poetry, 1999)
Mácula (poetry, 2002)
Árbol desconocido (poetry, 2002)
Elegías romanas (poetry, 2004)

References

External links

Official blog

1975 births
Living people
People from Llanes
Spanish male writers
Asturian language